Keyt or KEYT may refer to:

 George Keyt, Sri Lankan painter
 Keyt baronets in 17th–18th century England
 KEYT-TV, a television station in California